The Clinton Sampson Blues was the final moniker of the minor league baseball teams based in Clinton, North Carolina and within Sampson County, North Carolina from 1946 to 1950. The Clinton teams played exclusively as members of the Class D level Tobacco State League, hosting home games at the Clinton High School Park. The franchise played as the Clinton Blues from 1946 to 1948. The Clinton teams were a minor league affiliate of the Detroit Tigers in 1948.

History
Clinton, North Carolina first hosted minor league play in 1946.  The "Clinton Blues" became charter members of the six–team Class D level Tobacco State League. The Angier-Fuquay Springs Bulls, Dunn-Erwin Twins, Sanford Spinners, Smithfield-Selma Leafs and Wilmington Pirates joined Clinton as charter members in Tobacco State League play.

The 1946 Clinton Blues advanced to the league finals in their first season of play, their only playoff appearance. Clinton finished the 1946 Tobacco State League regular season with a 70–48 record to place 2nd, finishing 0.5 game behind the 1st place Sanford Spinners. Playing under managers Willie Duke and Van Mungo, Clinton advanced to the playoffs. In the first round of the Tobacco State League playoffs, Clinton defeated the Smithfield-Selma Leafs 4 games to 1. In the finals, the Angier-Fuquay Springs Bulls defeated the Clinton Blues 4 games to 3 to win the championship. Player/manager Willie Duke of Clinton led the Tobacco State League in batting average, hitting .393, while teammate Robert Keane led the league with 23 wins as a pitcher.

Continuing Tobacco State League play, the 1947 Clinton Blues finished in 6th place. Playing under managers Robert Hall, Van Mungo, Surven Wright and E. Jackson Bell in the eight–team league, Clinton ended the regular season with a 56–67 record. Clinton finished 29.0 games behind of the 1st place Sanford Spinners in the regular season standings, missing the playoffs. In the playoffs, Sanford became the league champions. L. C. Kerr, of Clinton, was reported to be the vice president of the Tobacco State League and president of the Clinton Blues in 1947.

The Blues' manager in 1946 and 1947, Van Mungro was the namesake of the song, Van Lingo Mungro, released as a single in 1969. "Van Lingle Mungo" was composed and performed by jazz pianist Dave Frishberg. Frishberg also wrote both the lyrics and the music. The song was distributed by Red Day Division of Doramus, Inc. under CTI Records. It was originally released as a single, but later incorporated into Oklahoma Toad, Frishberg's 1970 LP. Frishberg reportedly developed the melody first, but couldn't settle on lyrics, rejecting several sets of lyrics he drafted. Frishberg was noted to have browsed through a copy of a baseball encyclopedia, where he found the name of Van Lingle Mungo, a name he found unusual. He later found himself humming Mungo's name to the melody and incorporated it into the song. Jazz critic and author Ira Gitler considers "Van Lingle Mungo" as "one of the best jazz works of the 70s and certainly the best ever done combining jazz and baseball." The song has been entered in the National Baseball Library, a section of the National Baseball Hall of Fame.

In 1948, the Clinton Blues continued play, becoming a minor league affiliate of the Detroit Tigers. The Blues ended the regular season in 6th place with a 70–67 record, playing under manager Marvin Lorenz. The Blues finished 10.5 games behind the of the 1st placed Sanford Spinners in the final Tobacco State League standings. Clinton did not qualify for the playoffs, won by the Red Springs Red Robins.

Continuing play in the 1949 Tobacco State League, the Clinton Sampson Blues placed 7th in the eight–team league. The team name was changed to include the location of Sampson County, North Carolina. The Blues finished the regular season with a record of 60–79, playing under manager John Streza. Clinton finished 22.5 games behind the 1st place Dunn-Erwin Twins in the regular season standings. Clinton did not qualify for the Tobacco State League playoffs, which were won by the Red Springs Red Robins.
 
In their final season, the 1950 Clinton Sampson Blues placed 5th, missing the Tobacco State League playoffs. With a record of 61–72, playing under managers Alvin Kluttz and Nicholas Rhabe, the Clinton Sampson Blues finished 30 games behind the 1st place Lumberton Auctioneers. Clinton Sampson failed to qualify for the playoffs, won by the Rockingham Eagles. The Tobacco State League permanently folded following the 1950 season.

In 1950, player/manager Alvin Kluttz batted .373 for the Blues. Kluttz had been wounded in World War II, shot through the left arm during battle in 1945. After surgery, 21 pieces of shrapnel remained in his arm. Kluttz returned to his baseball career following his October, 1945 discharge despite the permanent injury. Kluttz received the Bronze Star for his service.

Clinton, North Carolina has not hosted another minor league team.

The ballpark
The Clinton based minor league teams were noted to have played home games at the Clinton High School Park. The location of the ballpark was reported as 1201 West Elizabeth Street, Clinton, North Carolina. Today, Sampson Middle School is at the location.

Timeline

Year-by-year records

Notable alumni
John Burrows (1946)
Earl Mossor (1946)
Van Mungo (1946–1947, MGR) 5 x MLB All–Star

See also
Clinton Blues players

References

External links
 Baseball Reference

Defunct minor league baseball teams
Professional baseball teams in North Carolina
Defunct baseball teams in North Carolina
Baseball teams established in 1949
Baseball teams disestablished in 1950
Sampson County, North Carolina
Tobacco State League teams